The Crystal Sceptre (occasionally described as a mace) is part of the regalia of the Lord Mayor of London. It was presented to the City of London by King Henry V in return for having provided the king with 10,000 marks (£6,666) to fund a war in France in 1415, when his army captured Harfleur and then won the Battle of Agincourt.

Description
At the top is a gold crown with alternating fleur-de-lys and cross embellishments, mounted with jewels including Afghan red spinel, Ceylon blue sapphires, and pearls from the Persian Gulf. Within the circlet of the crown is a painting on parchment of the Royal Arms of England adopted in 1406, quartering three fleurs-de-lys for France with three lions for England. The crown may have been adapted from a religious sculpture of the Virgin Mary. The other end has a large glass boss.

History
The sceptre was probably made in Paris, c.1380–1420, and presented to the City of London between 1415 and 1421: it was depicted being held by the Lord Mayor of London in a painting of the coronation of Queen Catherine of Valois In February 1421.   A rare object of medieval gold to have survived to the modern day, it was hidden during the Commonwealth and kept safe by the Lord Mayor Sir Thomas Bloodworth during the Great Fire of London in 1666.  The glass boss was replaced by the jewellers Rundell, Bridge & Rundell in the 1830s.

The sceptre is kept in the City's vaults, and usually only seen in public at the coronation of a monarch. It is one of the symbolic items – sceptre, sword, purse, seal – that are touched during the annual Silent Ceremony to install a new Lord Mayor each November, but remains in its protective box throughout.

The sceptre went on public display for the first time in 2015, at the Guildhall Art Gallery.

References
 The greatest thank you gift in English history goes on show, The Telegraph, 11 October 2015
 Henry V's 'Crystal Sceptre' displayed at Guildhall Art Gallery, cityoflondon.gov.uk, 12 October 2015
 Unveiling the Crystal Sceptre: Henry V's Gift to the City, cityoflondon.gov.uk, 24 October – 3 December 2015

Further reading

External links
 Hedon Mace – Links with Mayors, Lord Mayors and King Henry!, 27 May 2015
 Unveiling the Crystal Sceptre: Henry V's Gift to the City, London Guildhall Art Gallery, October 24 - December 3, agincourt600.com
 Postcard of the Lord Mayor carrying the Crystal Sceptre, at the Coronation of Edward VII, 1902 
 Henry V's 'Crystal Sceptre' on display for the first time, ianvisits.co.uk, 8 November 2015
 Sceptre gifted by Henry V to City of London after Battle of Agincourt goes on display, royalcentral.co.uk
 This Sceptred Isle, Guy the London Guide, 1 November 2015
 Henry V's Crystal Sceptre gift after Agincourt victory, BBC, 23 October 2015

History of London
Regalia